Aidan Murphy (born 24 April 1968), better known as Aidan Gillen, is an Irish actor. He is the recipient of three Irish Film & Television Awards and has been nominated for a British Academy Television Award, a British Independent Film Award, and a Tony Award.

On television, he played Stuart Alan Jones in the Channel 4 series Queer as Folk (1999–2000), Tommy Carcetti in the HBO series The Wire (2004–2008), John Boy in the RTÉ series Love/Hate (2010–2011), Petyr "Littlefinger" Baelish in the HBO series Game of Thrones (2011–2017), and Dr. J. Allen Hynek in The History Channel's Project Blue Book (2019–2020). In 2021, he appeared in the crime dramas Mayor of Kingstown and Kin.

His film roles include Miles Jackson in 12 Rounds (2009), CIA operative Bill Wilson in The Dark Knight Rises (2012), Janson in Maze Runner: The Scorch Trials (2015) and Maze Runner: The Death Cure (2018), Robert in The Lovers (2017), Queen's manager John Reid in Bohemian Rhapsody (2018), and Jack Blackwell in Those Who Wish Me Dead (2021). He also provided the voice and motion capture for Paul Serene in the 2016 video game Quantum Break.

Early life
Gillen was born in the Drumcondra area of Dublin on 24 April 1968, the youngest of six children born to Patricia (née Gillen) and Denis Murphy. He was educated at St. Vincent's C.B.S. in Dublin's Glasnevin neighbourhood.

Gillen began his acting career as a teenager, joining the National Youth Theatre at the age of fourteen and playing Nick Bottom in a production of A Midsummer Night's Dream at the Project Arts Centre when he was sixteen. The name Aidan Murphy was already registered so he began using his mother's maiden name as a stage name. He moved to London in 1987 when he was nineteen.

Career
Gillen played Stuart Alan Jones in the Channel 4 television series Queer as Folk and its sequel, for which he received a British Academy Television Award nomination for Best Actor. He was nominated for a Tony Award for his Broadway role in Harold Pinter's play The Caretaker and has also been nominated for an Irish Times Theatre Award for his portrayal of Teach in the Dublin Gate Theatre's 2007 production of David Mamet's American Buffalo.

In 2004, having been spotted by producers in The Caretaker, Gillen was cast as Tommy Carcetti in the HBO series The Wire, for which he received an Irish Film & Television Award for Best Actor in a Lead Role in Television. In 2008, he was named an "Irish cult hero" by the Sunday Tribune. He appeared in the 2009 film 12 Rounds, and in July of that year, he appeared in the one-off BBC2 drama Freefall. He co-starred as Phil Hendrick in the British drama Thorne.

In 2011, Gillen began playing Petyr "Littlefinger" Baelish on the HBO series Game of Thrones, for which he received his second Irish Film & Television Award nomination. He appeared in seven seasons, until his character's death in the season 7 finale "The Dragon and the Wolf". He starred as cop killer Barry Weiss in the British crime-thriller Blitz and in the British horror film Wake Wood. Gillen played crime boss John Boy in the acclaimed Irish crime-drama Love/Hate, for which he received his third Irish Film & Television Award nomination and second win.

In 2012, he played CIA operative Bill Wilson (the character's name is from the novelisation; his name is not directly said in the film's script) in The Dark Knight Rises, his first role in a major Hollywood film. Gillen said he enjoyed playing the role, but preferred low-budget lead roles to blockbuster bit-parts. Gillen's character was particularly noted by some Internet circles for his delivery of supposedly awkward dialogue in the film's opening plane scene, especially by users of 4chan's /tv/ board. Thus, he subsequently became the subject of an Internet meme popular among /tv/ users known as "Baneposting", which references the dialogue between Wilson and Tom Hardy's character Bane in said scene. The same year, Gillen also starred in the British spy-drama Shadow Dancer, and was announced as the new host of the music show Other Voices.

He starred in the BBC five-part thriller Mayday in 2013, and the Irish comedy-drama film Calvary the following year. He shared a Screen Actors Guild Award nomination with the cast of Game of Thrones for Outstanding Performance by an Ensemble in a Drama Series. Gillen also starred in the short film Ekki Múkk, created for the Valtari Mystery Film Experiment by Icelandic band Sigur Rós, as well as Janson in the second film, The Scorch Trials, and third film, Maze Runner: The Death Cure, in the Maze Runner trilogy.

Gillen played Queen's manager John Reid in the biopic Bohemian Rhapsody, which was released on 2 November 2018. He starred as Aidan in the short film titled I Didn't...I Wasn't...I Amn't, written and directed by Irish actress Laoisa Sexton.

He starred in The History Channel's two-season series Project Blue Book from 2019 to 2020. Gillen played Dr. J. Allen Hynek, a brilliant and underappreciated college professor who is recruited by the U.S. Air Force to spearhead an operation named Project Blue Book. He is joined by his partner Air Force Capt. Michael Quinn as they investigate UFO sightings around the country.

Personal life
Gillen resides in his native Dublin. He met Olivia O'Flanagan when they were teenagers. They have two children: Berry (b. March 1997) and Joe (b. October 2000). They married in 2001 and separated in 2015.

Gillen has been in a relationship with singer Camille O'Sullivan since 2017.

Filmography

Film

Television

Music videos

Audiobooks

Radio

Video games

Stage

Awards and nominations

References

External links

 
 The Guardian profile, 2012

1968 births
20th-century Irish male actors
21st-century Irish male actors
Irish male film actors
Irish male stage actors
Irish male television actors
Living people
Other Voices presenters
People from Drumcondra, Dublin
Male actors from Dublin (city)
Irish male video game actors